The Petrovka fortified settlement, namesake of the 2nd millennium BC Sintashta-Petrovka culture lies at the Ishim River, near the modern village of Petrovka in Zhambyl District, North Kazakhstan Region, Kazakhstan.

Archaeological sites in Kazakhstan
Former populated places in Kazakhstan
Indo-Iranian archaeological sites
Andronovo culture